Jiangxi University of Science and Technology is a university located in Ganzhou City, Jiangxi Province, People's Republic of China.

History
Established in 1958, this university was formerly known as Jiangxi Institute of Metallurgy. The university was renamed as Southern Institute of Metallurgy in 1988.

Schools
 School of Environmental and Construction Engineering
 School of Material and Chemical Engineering
 School of Mechanical and Electronic Engineering
 School of Information Engineering
 School of Economics and Management
 School of Sciences
 School of Liberal Arts and Law
 School of Foreign Studies
 School of Continuing Education
 School of Higher Vocational and Technical Education (Nanchang Campus)
 Applied Science Institute (Jinshawan Campus)

See also
Jinggangshan University

External links
JUST Official Website

Universities and colleges in Jiangxi
Technical universities and colleges in China